Marchinbar Island is the largest island in the Wessel Islands in the Northern Territory of Australia in the Arafura Sea.

Location
It is separated from Rimbija Island, the most northeasterly of the Wessel Islands, by a narrow channel, which is less than  meters across at its narrowest point. In the southeast, it is separated from Guluwuru Island by Cumberland Strait, which is  meters wide at its narrowest point.

Geomorphology
The island is a long and narrow island, 57.4 km long and maximally 8 km wide. It measures 210.9 km² in area. The most northerly point of the island is called Low Point. Sphinx Head is a site of conspicuous cliffs up to 67 meters high, about 16 km SSW of Low Point. Two flat-topped hills south of Sphinx Head rise to a maximum height of 79 metres. The entire east coast of the island is cliffy and high.

Administration
Administratively, Marchinbar Island is part of Gumurr Marthakal Ward of East Arnhem Region.

Settlement
The only settlement is Martjanba, a small family outstation on Jensen Bay in the northern part of the island.

Habitat
Marchinbar Island was until recently the last habitat still containing a population of the golden bandicoot (Isoodon auratus), which was once found throughout northern, central and western Australia, and as far south as New South Wales. As part of a salvage operation to ensure diversification, numbers of the Marchinbar Island bandicoots have been translocated to the islands of Raragala and Guluwuru.

Discovery of ancient coins
In 1944, nine coins were discovered at Djinjan creek immediately south of Jensen Bay. Four of the coins were later identified as Dutch duits dating from 1690 to the 1780s while five with Arabic inscriptions were identified as being from the Kilwa Sultanate of east Africa.  Only one such Kilwan coin had ever previously been found outside east Africa (unearthed during an excavation in Oman).  The inscriptions on the Jensen Bay coins identify a ruling Sultan of Kilwa, but it is unclear whether the ruler was from the 10th century or the 14th century.  This discovery has been of interest to those historians who believe it likely that seafaring people made landfall in Australia or its offshore islands after Aboriginal settlement and before the first generally accepted such sighting, by the Dutch sailor Willem Janszoon in 1606. A similar coin, also thought to be from the Medieval Kilwa sultanate was found in 2018 on Elcho Island, also in the Wessel Islands group.

Notes

Citations

Sources

External links
 Wessel Islands map

Islands of the Northern Territory
Pre-1606 contact with Australia